The 1989 Cincinnati Bearcats football team represented the University of Cincinnati during the 1989 NCAA Division I-A football season. The Bearcats, led by first-year head coach Tim Murphy, participated as independent and played their home games at Nippert Stadium.

Schedule

Roster

References

Cincinnati
Cincinnati Bearcats football seasons
Cincinnati Bearcats football